The Edge Festival was an annual music festival held in Edinburgh, Scotland, during August of each year. Formerly known as T on the Fringe, The Edge was part of the Edinburgh Festival Fringe, the world's largest arts fringe festival (to the larger Edinburgh Festival). Unlike other music festivals, The Edge did not take place at one location, with performers instead playing numerous venues across the city during the month. The festival was founded under the T on the Fringe name by DF Concerts and Tennent's Lager, with DF continuing to promote the festival after the departure of Tennent's from 2008 until 2012.

The festival began in 2000, with fifteen concerts in its first year. It was founded by Dave Corbett, after realising the lack of contemporary music taking place at the Edinburgh Festival. Since 2000, T on the Fringe has played host to some of the most commercially successful artists as well as the best in alternative and emerging talent. Over the years the event has seen performances by the likes of Pixies, Muse, Morrissey, Nancy Sinatra, Franz Ferdinand and Arcade Fire. The 2007 festival featured three concerts taking place at the 25,000 capacity Meadowbank Stadium, a record for the festival at the time.

History

2004 festival
 Embrace's performance at the Liquid Room was named "Best Gig of T on the Fringe 2004" by a judging panel consisting of the Sunday Mail, DF Concerts and Tennent's.

2005 festival
The 2005 festival took place between 5–31 August, with more than forty acts performing across five venues. The festival's main highlight was a performance by Pixies on 28 August 2005, playing as part of their reunion tour following a 12-year hiatus. The band performed at the city's Meadowbank Stadium, the first outdoor performance for the T on the Fringe festival, with support from Idlewild and Teenage Fanclub. The festival's other main draw was two homecoming performances by Franz Ferdinand in Princes Street Gardens on 30–31 August 2005, supported by Arcade Fire. The dates were the band's first performances in the country since December the previous year. Other headline T on the Fringe shows included The Prodigy, Alabama 3, The Zutons, Weezer, Basement Jaxx and Razorlight. During August, Edinburgh's Cabaret Voltaire venue hosted a number of free concerts, featuring former Squeeze lead vocalist Glenn Tilbrook, Michael Franti, Saul Williams, Trashcan Sinatras and Rachel Fuller performing acoustic sets between the 15—26 August. Idlewild would also play acoustically at the venue, appearing on 27 August prior to supporting Pixies. Idlewild's concert was later steamed online for three months following the festival, under the moniker of "T on the Fringe Radio". The broadcast also included a feature on the Best of T Break.

The festival was deemed a success by critics, with Lynsey Hanley of The Observer stating that "..[the festival's line-up] encompassed the past, present and future of alternative rock".

2006 festival
2006 saw 100,000 tickets sold for almost 60 gigs featuring 134 artists.  Snow Patrol rocked the 22,000 Meadowbank Stadium crowd in what was their biggest headline gig yet, while at the same time breaking a record already held by T on the Fringe for the biggest show at the Edinburgh Fringe. Radiohead performed at the same venue supported by Beck and Muse played the following night supported by My Chemical Romance.

2007 festival
The 2007 festival took place on 4—28 August across four venues, with more than 60 events taking place. The festival was marked by the announcement of three large outdoor concerts taking place at Meadowbank Stadium, which had increased in capacity to 25,000 for the event. Two of the headlining acts were announced as Foo Fighters and Kaiser Chiefs, with Razorlight later confirmed to play the stadium. The three concerts marked the biggest performances in the festival's history. Support acts for Foo Fighters and Razorlight were later confirmed as Nine Inch Nails and Silversun Pickups, and Editors, respectively. As well as this, independent record label Chemikal Underground announced a showcase at the Liquid Room featuring Mother and the Addicts, Aidan Moffat and De Rosa, in honor of the record label's 100th release. The festival's full line-up, announced on 7 June 2007, was as follows:

 Guillemots were originally scheduled to perform at the Corn Exchange, but chose instead to play two separate smaller performances, at the City Cafe and later in the Liquid Rooms. Greg Forbes of festival website eFestivals said that Editors' supporting concert at Meadowbank Stadium "blew them away", outperforming headliners Razorlight. In 2008, The Independent reported the 2007 event had sold 130,000 tickets, highlighting that the total number of events taking place had now quadrupled from the festival's inaugural year.

2008 festival
In 2008, it was announced that T on the Fringe would be rebranded as The Edge Festival, following the end of DF Concerts' partnership with Tennent's.

2009 festival
The 2009 event took place between 1–31 August, with more than fifty artists performing across seven venues. Organisers secured a number of high-profile revival acts, including David Byrne, Magazine and Faith No More, the band's first Scottish performance in over a decade. As well as this, performers included ex-Lightning Seeds frontman Ian Broudie, The Bluetones, Mumford & Sons, Biffy Clyro, Frightened Rabbit, Andrew Bird, Unicorn Kid and Young Fathers, The Streets, Amanda Palmer, múm, Broken Records and Calvin Harris. The List named Unicorn Kid and Young Fathers in their Top 20 Festival Shows list for 2009, the only appearance by an Edge Festival performance.

2010 festival
The 2010 event took place between 5—31 August. It marked the return of the Cabaret Voltaire venue, which had suffered fire damage the previous year. The first acts were announced in June 2010, with Dizzee Rascal confirmed to play the Corn Exchange. Further acts announced included Mika, Professor Green, Tinchy Stryder, Eels, Modest Mouse, Beirut, The Coral, The Divine Comedy, Doves, Steve Mason and Colin MacIntyre, The Phantom Band, Pearl and the Puppets, We Were Promised Jetpacks, Kassidy, Broken Records, The Low Anthem, Little Feat, General Fiasco, Gomez, Tom Gray, Phoenix, Get Cape. Wear Cape. Fly, Stornoway and dan le sac vs Scroobius Pip. The festival featured a performance by Michael Rother, formerly of Neu!.

References

External links
 The Edge Festival official website

Music festivals in Scotland
Edinburgh Festival
2000 establishments in Scotland
Recurring events established in 2000